Monica Seles was the defending champion, and successfully defended her title, defeating Arantxa Sánchez Vicario in the final 6–1, 7–6(7–2).

Seeds
A champion seed is indicated in bold text while text in italics indicates the round in which that seed was eliminated. The top eight seeds received a bye to the second round.

  Monica Seles (champion)
  Arantxa Sánchez Vicario (final)
  Iva Majoli (second round)
  Anke Huber (second round)
  Mary Joe Fernández (quarterfinals)
  Magdalena Maleeva (quarterfinals)
  Brenda Schultz-McCarthy (second round)
  Mary Pierce (third round)
  Gabriela Sabatini (third round)
  Amanda Coetzer (third round)
  Irina Spîrlea (first round)
  Karina Habšudová (second round)
  Amy Frazier (quarterfinals)
  Helena Suková (first round)
  Nathalie Tauziat (third round)
  Elena Likhovtseva (third round)

Draw

Finals

Top half

Section 1

Section 2

Bottom half

Section 3

Section 4

References
 1996 du Maurier Open Draw

Singles
1996 du Maurier Open